AN/SQS-26 was a United States Navy surface ship, bow mounted, low frequency, active/passive sonar developed by the Naval Underwater Sound Laboratory and built by General Electric and the EDO Corporation. At one point, it was installed on 87 US Navy warships from the 1960s to the 1990s and may still be in use on ships transferred to other navies.

Capabilities
It could be operated as a passive sonar on the 1.5 kHz frequency or as an active sonar at 3–4 kHz. It had direct path, bottom reflected, passive and convergence zone (CZ) capabilities.

Variants
AN/SQS-26 AXR - s, FF-1037, 1038
AN/SQS-26 AXR - s, FF-1040, 1041, 1043, 1044, 1045 and FF-1098 (formerly AGFF-1)
AN/SQS-26 AXR - s, FFG-1, 2, 3
AN/SQS-26 AXR - s, CG-26, 27
The original AX sonars were manufactured by General Electric Heavy Military Electronics.  The "R" suffix was the result of a "Retrofit" by GE that incorporated improved designs derived from the AN/SQS-26CX sonar, also manufactured by GE.
AN/SQS-26 BX - Garcia-class frigates, FF-1047, 1048, 1049, 1050, 1051
AN/SQS-26 BX - Brooke-class frigates, FFG-4, 5, 6
AN/SQS-26 BX - Belknap-class cruisers, CG-28, 29, 30, 31, 32, 33, 34
AN/SQS-26 BX - , CGN-35
BX sonars were manufactured by EDO Corporation.
AN/SQS-26 CX - s, FF-1052-1097
AN/SQS-26 CX - s, CGN-36, 37
AN/SQS-26 CX - s, CGN-38, 39, 40, 41
CX sonars were manufactured by General Electric Heavy Military Electronics. AN/SQS-26CX sonar performs a 360-deg, long-range sector search at low frequency.

AN/SQS-53
AN/SQS-53 is an improved version of AN/SQS-26CX and the main difference between the SQS-26CX and SQS-53 sonars is the digital computer interface with the Mk 116 anti-submarine warfare (ASW) weapon control system in the latter. In addition, AN/SQS-53 sonar can also be fitted with the Kingfisher small obstacle (mines) avoidance sonar. Specification:
Operating frequency: 3 kHz
Peak frequency: 192 kHz
Array height: 1.6 m (5'2")
Array diameter: 4.8 m (15'7")
Versions:
AN/SQS-53A: Original version with analog control and display, used on various destroyers and cruisers. Installed on early s (CG-47 to 55).
AN/SQS-53B: Original analog control and display in AN-SQS-53A replaced by digital, solid-state controls and displays incorporating built-in test system and AN/UYS-1 acoustic signal processor for integration with the digital AN/SQQ-89 system. Installed on later Ticonderoga-class cruisers (CG-56 onward) as part of AN/SQQ-89.
AN/SQS-53C: Improvement of AN/SQS-53B that is 50% smaller in volume and weight with improved reliability: mean time between failure is 2000 hours. new transducers with higher power and wider bandwidth and incorporating AN/UYK-44(V) digital computers in addition to UYK-1. Installed on s.

References

External links
http://www.globalsecurity.org/military/systems/ship/systems/an-sqs-26.htm
Article title
http://www.gao.gov/assets/210/202343.pdf

Military sonar equipment of the United States
Military electronics of the United States